The Miss South Africa 2015 pageant took place on March 29, 2015 at the Sun City Superbowl. The pageant was broadcast on M-Net and Mzansi Magic. The final was contested by 12 girls who were selected after weeks of challenges at Sun City International. The pageant was hosted by television and radio personality Thomas Mlambo .

Liesl Laurie from Johannesburg  was crowned Miss South Africa 2015 by the outgoing title holder Zipozakhe Zokufa. Miss World 2014 Rolene Strauss attended the event, along with two other South Africans to have won Miss World, Penelope Coelen, Miss World 1958 and Anneline Kriel, Miss World 1974.

Winner and runners-up
Color keys

Top 12

Judges 
 Actress and TV personality Sophie Ndaba.
 Poet and writer, Kojo Baffoe.
 Miss World in 1974,Anneline Kriel (Bacon) 
 Bloemfontein designer, Casper Bosman.

References

External links

2015
South Africa
2015 in South Africa
March 2015 events in South Africa